Pragatisheel Manav Samaj Party (PMSP) is a political party in Uttar Pradesh, India. PMSP is based amongst the Bind and Mallah communities. The mafia don Brijesh Singh contested the 2012 Uttar Pradesh Assembly elections on its ticket, from the Sayyadraja constituency.

References 

Political parties in Uttar Pradesh
Political parties with year of establishment missing